Sengottai is a 1996 Indian Tamil-language political action film directed by C. V. Sasikumar and produced by R. B. Choudary. The film stars Arjun Sarja, Meena and Rambha. It was released on 19 April 1996, and bombed at the box-office.

Plot 
Thirumoorthy, a corrupt politician, aspires to become the prime minister and hires a terrorist to kill the current prime minister. In jail, Sekhar is engaged by a terrorist, and they escape from the jail. He reveals that he is a police officer, kills the terrorists and catches the leader. He is then praised for saving the prime minister by his superiors.

Neelakandan, an orthodox Brahmin, is Sekhar's father's best friend and Sekhar's father decides to marry his son to Neelakandan's daughter Meena. Franka, an Indo-French girl, also lives with them to learn about their culture. But Sekhar is in love with Yamuna. One day, Sekhar has the mission to find Franka, who is supposed to be lost. A killer misses to kill Sekhar at the time, instead he kills Yamuna.

Meena is jailed as she is considered to be killing Franka. Sekhar invites Thirumoorthy for Gandhi Jayanti to prison, where Meena attempts to kill him. The same killer who killed Yamuna tries to kill Meena, but Sekhar saves her. Sekhar enquires Meena, and she reveals the truth.

Franka's handbag is robbed with her passport inside it. Meena and Franka complain at the police station. Franka is called at the police station, but Thirumoorthy rapes and murders her. Thangamani, a police officer, promises to Meena to arrest the culprit, and he first prevented his partner Thirumoorthy. Thangamani arrested Meena, and the villagers humiliated her family, Meena's family have self-immolated.

Sekhar married Meena in the jail, and Meena is released on bail. Sekhar is unable to arrest Thirumoorthy because it would be a black mark for his country. Thangamani refuses to provide information to Sekhar, so he beats Thangamani. Thangamani reveals all about Thirumoorthy, however, a hitman kills Thangamani and kidnaps Sekhar. Thirumoorthy threatens Sekhar to kill his father and his wife if he doesn't kill the prime minister himself.

Despite, Sekhar is escorted by Thirumoorthy's henchmen in the plane, he manages to escape from the plane. He finds the place where his father and his wife are sequestrated, and saves them.

To save the prime minister, Sekhar finds the sniper and kills him. Thirumoorthy decides to kill the prime minister, but Sekhar saves him and kills Thirumoorthy.

Cast 

Arjun Sarja as SP Sekhar IPS
Meena as Meena
Rambha as Yamuna
Vijayakumar as Sekhar's father
Rajan P. Dev as Thirumoorthy
Hemanth Ravan
Delhi Ganesh as Nilakanda sasthri
Kumarimuthu
Chinni Jayanth
Roshan Seth as Prime Minister
Sethu Vinayagam
Franka as Franka
Anandaraj as Thangamani (guest appearance)
Vadivelu (guest appearance)

Soundtrack 
The music was composed by Vidyasagar, with lyrics written by Vaali, Vairamuthu, Muthulingam and Palani Bharathi.

Reception 
Tharamani of Kalki wrote .

References

External links 
 

1990s political films
1990s Tamil-language films
1996 action films
1996 films
Central Bureau of Investigation in fiction
Cultural depictions of prime ministers of India
Films about rape in India
Films about terrorism in India
Films scored by Vidyasagar
Films set in Delhi
Films set in Tamil Nadu
Films set in Uttar Pradesh
Films shot in Agra
Films shot in Delhi
Films shot in Tamil Nadu
Indian action films
Indian political films
Political action films
Super Good Films films